Hopetown is a 2000 album by New Zealand singer-songwriter Dave Dobbyn. It reached number 9 on the New Zealand music charts. The album was produced by fellow Th' Dudes member Ian Morris.

Track listing

Critical reception
The album received a favourable reception, with reviewers praising the optimistic and carefree nature of the album. "Just Add Water" was noted as being quirkily reminiscent of Dobbyn's 1986 hit single "Slice of Heaven".

References

External links
 Background of Hopetown by producer Ian Morris

Dave Dobbyn albums
2000 albums